Harris C. Hartwell (December 28, 1847 – December 9, 1891) was a Massachusetts lawyer and politician who served in the Massachusetts House of Representatives, and as a member and President of, the Massachusetts Senate.

Family life
Hartwell married Effie M. F. Nedham of Groton, Massachusetts on October 23, 1877. They had two children Norcross N. Hartwell; and Harold H. Hartwell.

See also
 109th Massachusetts General Court (1888)
 110th Massachusetts General Court (1889)

References

Massachusetts lawyers
Politicians from Fitchburg, Massachusetts
Republican Party members of the Massachusetts House of Representatives
Republican Party Massachusetts state senators
Presidents of the Massachusetts Senate
Harvard University alumni
1847 births
1891 deaths
19th-century American politicians
19th-century American lawyers